Mount Bigelow is a mountain in the Santa Catalina Mountains of Arizona, U.S. It is home to the astronomical observing facility Catalina Station which operates the 61" Kuiper Telescope owned by the Steward Observatory of the University of Arizona. It is one of the telescopes used by students at Astronomy Camp.

References

External links 
 
 

Landforms of Pima County, Arizona
Mountains of Pima County, Arizona